Benjamin Thomas Gunter (December 16, 1865 – March 31, 1939) was an American politician who served as a member of the Virginia Senate.

His son, Ben T. Gunter Jr., served in the Senate from 1944 to 1952.

References

External links
 

1865 births
1939 deaths
Democratic Party Virginia state senators
20th-century American politicians